Michael Lawrence Gabler (born September 4, 1970), also known by just his surname Gabler, is an American heart valve specialist and television personality known for competing on and winning the 43rd season of the American reality TV competition series Survivor. After being named the winner, Gabler declared that he would donate "100%" of the million dollar prize to charities supporting veterans.

Survivor

Survivor 43 
Starting out as part of the Baka tribe, Gabler took notice of his social standing in the tribe. As the oldest player of the season, Gabler knew he would be at an immediate disadvantage, and so he worked tirelessly to forge social bonds with the other members of his tribe. Specifically, he made alliances with Owen Knight and Sami Layadi, and also made overtures towards Elie Scott, using heavy metal music as a mutual interest. During the first few days on Baka, Gabler also gained possession of a timed hidden immunity idol, earning it in a summit challenge by risking his vote successfully. However, when Baka lost the first immunity challenge, Gabler took the blame for the loss and publicly announced he would not be playing his idol and instead leaving his fate to the “shot in the dark.” He was immediately dissuaded from doing so by his tribemates, further highlighting the strong social connections Gabler had already built. Morriah Young was voted out at the first tribal council.

Humbled by this experience, Baka rallied and were more successful in the rest of the challenges in the pre-merge stage of the game. However, the threat of Gabler’s idol (which expired after two tribal councils Gabler attended) loomed large in the minds of the other Baka members, specifically Scott and her closest ally Jeanine Zheng. Spurred by Scott, Zheng snooped through Gabler’s bag to read the idol clue to confirm the wording on the idol’s rules, in an attempt to potentially blindside Gabler by fooling him into thinking the idol was already expired. However, Layadi was looped in on this plan and immediately told Gabler of Scott’s duplicity. Gabler realized that his erstwhile ally was potentially coming after him, and set about to make the first move.

Gabler’s opportunity arose when the tribes dissolved into the “earn-the-merge” portion of the game. Half the players won immunity in a challenge while the remaining players were vulnerable. Gabler, who was among the immunity winners, took advantage of the other players’ reticence to pitch potential boots by throwing Scott’s name into the mix, citing her deceit towards him as a motivating factor. Despite Scott attempting to keep the remaining Baka members together and protect herself, Gabler’s plan succeeded and his former ally was voted out just before the tribes merged.

Now that the game had reached the individual stage, Gabler further capitalized on his momentum from the Scott blindside by winning the first immunity challenge. However, recognizing that his profile was starting to peak, Gabler eased back, allowing other players to rise in dominance and threat level around him. However, Gabler was anything but sedentary, and during this period he began making connections with the remaining jurors. He solidified his bonds with Knight and Layadi from his old tribe, but Gabler also built a strong rapport with each of the remaining players as well, most notably Cody Assenmacher and Jesse Lopez. This trio formed what became known as the “Ride or Die” alliance, which ended up dictating much of the gameplay at the back end of the game. This allowed Gabler to remain in the shadows while the louder, flashier players like Assenmacher and Lopez became bigger targets, but his involvement in the alliance carried more weight than simply being an extra vote.

However, Gabler knew that if he were to win, he could not go to the end with the “Ride or Die” alliance, but he could not pull the trigger himself without blowing his cover. His gameplay involved planting seeds in Lopez’s mind, mentioning that Lopez’s gameplay needed differentiating from Assenmacher’s, who was seen as the social force driving the duo’s decisions. Gabler also started laying the groundwork in a similar manner with Cassidy Clark against her ally Karla Cruz Godoy. Gabler’s machinations, while subtle, eventually grew fruit, as Lopez blindsided Assenmacher with his own hidden immunity idol. Cruz Godoy was voted out subsequently.

At the final four, Lopez was the clear favourite to win the game, but he lost the final immunity challenge to Clark. Knowing that Lopez had a last opportunity to save himself by the fire-making challenge, Clark selected Gabler (partially at his urging) to make fire against Lopez. Gabler wound up making fire faster than any other player in the history of the show, sending Lopez out of the game and onto the jury. The final three players left in the game were Gabler, Clark and Knight, who all pled their cases in front of the jury. Gabler highlighted his strong social game at Final Tribal Council, emphasizing his strategy of hiding in plain sight, juggling multiple alliances without ever being targeted or having any blood on his hands. The jury was impressed with Gabler’s strong social game and his simple but effective strategy, and granted him the title of Sole Survivor in a 7-1-0 vote.

Gabler is the second-oldest American winner of Survivor, after Bob Crowley, and is the only one in the American version of the show to be the oldest contestant of his winning season. He is also the eleventh winner to win the game while receiving zero votes cast against them the entire game.

See also
Survivor 43

References

Winners in the Survivor franchise
Living people
People from Meridian, Idaho
Survivor (American TV series) winners
1970 births